David Lee Jordan (born April 3, 1934) is an American politician who is currently a Democratic member of the Mississippi State Senate, representing the 24th District since 1993. Jordan is the son of a sharecropper who participated in the Civil Rights Movement, and worked for 33 years as a schoolteacher in Mississippi public schools.

References

External links
Mississippi State Senate profile of David Jordan 
Project Vote Smart profile of Jordan 
Follow the Money - David Lee Jordan
2007 2005 2003 and 1999 campaign contributions

1934 births
African-American state legislators in Mississippi
Living people
People from Leflore County, Mississippi
Democratic Party Mississippi state senators
Mississippi Valley State University alumni
University of Wyoming alumni
21st-century American politicians
21st-century African-American politicians
20th-century African-American people
Schoolteachers from Mississippi